Álvaro Omer So Jaló (born 13 March 1992), known as Álvaro Jaló, is a Portuguese professional footballer who plays for Oriental de Lisboa, as a forward.

References

External links

1992 births
Living people
Portuguese footballers
Association football forwards
Casa Pia A.C. players
FC Zimbru Chișinău players
Portuguese expatriate footballers
Expatriate footballers in Moldova